Thelma Rodgers is a retired Antarctic scientist from New Zealand. She was the first woman to spend a winter at Scott Base, New Zealand's scientific base in Antarctica.

Life 
Rodgers grew up in the Nelson area of the South Island of New Zealand. She worked as a science technician in the geophysics division of the Department of Scientific and Industrial Research and spent the winter at Scott Base in 1979. She was the first woman to winter-over at the base.

In 2017 a laboratory in the newly refurbished Hilary Field Centre at Scott Base was named after her.

References

Living people
Year of birth missing (living people)
People from Nelson, New Zealand
New Zealand Antarctic scientists